Émalleville is a commune in the Eure department in northern France.

Population
The inhabitants are called Émallevillais.

See also
Communes of the Eure department

References

Communes of Eure